Dhamaal is a 2007 Indian Hindi-language comedy film directed by Indra Kumar and produced by Ashok Thakeria. The film stars Sanjay Dutt, Ritesh Deshmukh, Arshad Warsi, Aashish Chaudhary and Javed Jaffrey in the lead roles while Asrani, Sanjay Mishra, Murli Sharma, Vijay Raaz, Manoj Pahwa, Tiku Talsania and Prem Chopra are featured in supporting roles. It is heavily inspired from the 2001 American comedy film Rat Race directed by Jerry Zucker (which in turn was inspired by Stanley Kramer's 1963 film It's a Mad, Mad, Mad, Mad World). It is the first installment of the Dhamaal film series.

In 2011, the film spawned a sequel, under the title of Double Dhamaal, with the lead cast reprising their roles.

A third reboot sequel, under the name Total Dhamaal was released in February 2019, with only Deshmukh, Warsi and Jaffrey returning with an entirely new cast and a fresh story, having no connections to Dhamaal and Double Dhamaal.

Plot 
Roy (Riteish Deshmukh) is kicked out of his job for not guarding a certain building. Adi (Arshad Warsi) is using a mixtape to play a saxophone. After his audience finds out, they thrash him. Adi's autistic brother Manav (Javed Jaffrey) tries to get a Rs. 50 Banknote back from a guy by reaching his wallet, only for his hand to be stuck in the guy's back pocket, while putting the wallet back after getting the money.The guy soon finds out and thrashes Manav. Boman Contractor (Ashish Chaudhary) accidentally damages his father Nari's (Asrani) car's window, he is then kicked out of his house by Nari. All four of them wind up together in a woman's (Suhasini Mulay) house, where they go partying at nightclubs. In the house however, they're useless, as they don't do anything around and haven't paid their rent yet, after they play pranks on the woman, she kicks them out of the house for not paying their rents and tells them to get a decent job.

Desperate to earn money, they devise up a plan. Adi tells Manav to steal a painting from the house. They decide to sell it to the son of the late Businessman Dwiwedi. However, Manav accidentally picks up a blank painting not knowing the reality. They humorously sell the painting for Rs. 20,000 to Dwiwedi. They then pick up the original painting with the intention to sell it to Mr. Aggarwal, not knowing that he has been murdered. The case is handled by Inspector Gadha Kulkarni (Murli Sharma). He learns that before Mr. Aggrawal was murdered, he was speaking on the phone to somebody and he mentioned the words "horse" and "grass." He interprets these words to be some code language. The four arrive at Agrawal's residence. Kulkarni demands to see the painting. Seeing the horse and grass on the painting, he immediately arrests them.

While driving on the highway, Kulkarni frees the foursomes upon being informed that they are innocent. The four are overjoyed until they suddenly witness a car accident and encounter the dying driver, Don Bose (Prem Chopra). He tells them that he has hidden a treasure of 10 crore in the St. Sebastian garden in Goa under a big 'W'. He tells them to divide the money equally among themselves and then dies. They come across Inspector Kabir Nayak (Sanjay Dutt) who has been trying to arrest Bose for the past ten years. He tries to extract information from the four but in vain, and they escape from there and decide to travel to Goa. Desperate for his promotion, Kabir is determined to capture the four. All four friends steal Boman's car which still belongs to Nari. The friends manage to steal the car but not before hitting Nari on the head and making him unconscious. Roy loses control of the car in a forest and hits it against a tree, breaking both headlights. They decide to spend the night in the car. The next day Kabir is transferred to Yavatmal for failing to capture Bose. Furious, he walks towards his table where Nari is waiting for him to file a complaint against his son for stealing his car. He gives Kabir the photos of Boman and his car. Meanwhile, all four come across a broken bridge which is the only way through the forest. They decide to jump the car but Boman is reluctant to do so. They manage to jump the car to the other side but it crashes and explodes.

Kabir tracks the four down after discovering the destroyed car. He is able to learn the location of the treasure due to Manav's dumbness. He ties all four of them to a tree and sets off. However, they manage to escape and it is revealed that Roy had actually cut the engine wires of Kabir's car so he must have not gone too far. They reach a dhaba and pretend to be detectives. They make the villagers and the dhaba owner believe that Kabir is Pasha, a dangerous gang leader and lures them to capture him for the reward would be Rs. 15 lakhs. Kabir defeats the villagers and he and the four arrive at a settlement – 60% would belong to the four and 40% would belong to Kabir. But Adi insists on having his and Manav's money in separate shares when they were planning to pay Boman as one share for damaging his car. Consequently, a fight ensues and is decided that whoever reaches the treasure first would take all the money.

All four part ways and try to reach Goa as soon as possible. Roy encounters a dacoit Babu Bhai (Sanjay Mishra) and agree to divide the money among themselves provided they reach Goa as soon as possible. Boman also encounters his father. Though Nari initially wants to kill his son, he changes his mind after he learns about the ten crores. Adi and Manav travel together. Kabir nearly escapes death as he hangs off a cliff and is pushed to deal with some school children who were supposed to visit and perform at a charity event. Adi and Manav fail to hitch a ride to take them to Goa until they bump into Iyer, who irritates them throughout the journey by continuously extending his patronymic name while introducing himself. This particular idea was loosely inspired from Arturo Cartoffoli helping Tintin to chase down the Sildavian kidnappers of Professor Calculus in "The Calculus Affair".

Nari and Boman find a private pilot but hilarious conditions cause the duo to fly in utter despair when the pilot abandons the steer and collapses into alcoholism while airline customer service provider D.K. Malik pushes them to near madness, failing to save himself, but they manage to reach Goa. Finally, as they together reach the garden, they mutually agree to find the treasure together before dividing it. Manav is able to locate four palm trees which make the shape of a 'W' when a crow defecates on Adi. But Kabir arrives there and tells them to divide the money against them to which all agree. They dig there and are able to find the money. But again a fight ensues over the payment for the damage of the car. All are enraged when Adi and Manav decide to pay the money as one unit but are separate units while taking money. The fight goes on during which Kabir takes all the money and runs. He tries to escape in a hot air balloon on a beach but finds it tied to a pole. He dives in an effort to cut the rope but is beaten up by the rest who pursue him. The balloon blows off shore and all are disheartened.

Conditions change when the wind changes direction and the balloon again blows onshore. Night falls and they follow the balloon in a towing van. The balloon clashes against a pole and the bag falls down. All of them try to collect as much money as they can when suddenly some spot lights focus on them and a crowd cheers loudly behind them. Realizing that they are on a stage and the occasion is the charity event to be attended by the performing children who were with Kabir, they further learn about the pathetic condition of the orphaned kids who were to be honored through charity, and decide to donate the money to the orphans. At the end, the chief guest of the event – Commissioner M.I Chaturvedi, who is Kabir's boss, praises all of them, while also telling Kabir that he will receive his promotion and that there is no better of use of this money than giving it for a charitable cause.

The film ends on a happy note conveying that the fate of the money was already decided. It never belonged to the four friends. They were just a medium which helped the money reach its true destination.

Cast 
 Sanjay Dutt as Inspector Kabir Naik
 Riteish Deshmukh as Deshbandhu Roy: Boman, Manav and Adi's best friend
 Arshad Warsi as Aditya "Adi" Shrivastav: Manav's brother, Roy and Boman's best friend
 Aashish Chaudhary as Boman Contractor: Nari's son and Adi, Manav & Roy's best friend.
 Jaaved Jaaferi as Manav Shrivastav: Adi's brother and Boman & Roy's best friend
 Prem Chopra as Bose
 Asrani as Nari Contractor, Boman's eccentric father
 Tiku Talsania as Commissioner M. I. Chaturvedi
 Vijay Raaz as Dev Kumar "D. K." Malik 
 Suhasini Mulay as the Landlady
 Sanjay Mishra as Dacoit Babu Bhai, Roy's friend 
 Murali Sharma as Inspector Kulkarni
 Muhammad Zaki as crying old man
 Vinay Apte as Prabhakarna Sripalawardhana Atapattu Jayasuriya Laxmana Shivramkrishna Shivavenkata Rajshekhara Srinivasana Trichipalli Yekyaparampeel Parambatur Chinnaswami Mutthuswami Venugopala Iyer
 Vijay Patkar as Air Traffic Controller
 Rana Jung Bahadur as Kailash, the owner of a Dhaba
 Surendra Rajan as Orphanage Man
 Ninad Kamat as Function Host
 Ankita M. Sharma as Shabnam "Shabbo", the woman going to Mental Hospital
 Liam Mara
 Tariq Zaheer
 Manoj Pahwa as Pilot Amyjot Randhawa
 Kiku Sharda as Constable
 D. Santosh as Encounter Cop
 Sahil Chauhan as Kid Himesh Reshammiya
 Kurush Deboo as Amit Dwivedi, Dwivedi's son (victim of the fraud painting con)
 Sanjay Swaraj as Samir Agarwal (special appearance)
 Karmveer Choudhary in Kailash Da Dhaba
 Vaibhav Mathur as Dacoit's man
 Vishwajeet Soni as Bengali Car Driver
 Jayesh Thakkar as Taxi Driver

Soundtrack 

The film's soundtrack is composed by Adnan Sami with lyrics penned by Sameer. The songs, "Dekho Dekho" and "Miss India Marthi Mujhpe", were both known as the title song, since the main chorus of both the songs included the title "Dhamaal".

Sequel 
A sequel named Double Dhamaal was released in 2011. The third film of the franchise was named Total Dhamaal and released in 2019.

See also 
 Mast Maja Maadi

References

External links 
 
 Dhamaal (film series)

2007 films
2000s Hindi-language films
Indian comedy road movies
Indian remakes of American films
2000s adventure comedy films
Films directed by Indra Kumar
Indian adventure comedy films
Hindi films remade in other languages
2000s comedy road movies
2007 comedy films